Forward! is a collection of science fiction stories by American writer Gordon R. Dickson.  It was first published by Baen Books in 1985, and was edited by Sandra Miesel.  Most of the stories originally appeared in the magazines Galaxy Science Fiction, Other Worlds, Fantasy and Science Fiction and Orbit.

Contents

 Editor’s Introduction, by Sandra Miesel
 "Building on the Line"
 "Babes in the Wood"
 "Napoleon’s Skullcap"
 "Rescue Mission"
 "Robots are Nice?"
 "The Dreamsman"
 "The R of A"
 "One on Trial"
 "The Queer Critter"
 "Twig"
 "The Game of Five"
 "Guided Tour"

Sources

1985 short story collections
Short story collections by Gordon R. Dickson